Joan Milton Cwaik (born June 19, 1990 in Buenos Aires) is an Argentinian technology communicator, entrepreneur, speaker and technologist. In 2020 he published his first book 7R: Las siete revoluciones tecnológicas que transformarán nuestra vida (7R: The seven tech revolutions that will change our life'). In 2021 he released his second book, El Dilema Humano: Del Homo Sapiens al Homo Tech (The Human Dilemma: From Homo Sapiens to Homo Tech).

Career 
Joan Cwaik was born in 1990 and had a BA in Media and Entertainment Management at Universidad Argentina de la Empresa (UADE), where since 2016 he teaches, does research and has coordinated its Technologic Communication Center. In 2013 he obtained a postgraduate degree in Multimedia Convergence at Buenos Aires University. He has an MBA from the IAE Business School of the Austral University from Argentina.

In 2013 he was part of the communication team of the Net Party, a political party that proposes an online form of liquid democracy, founded by the entrepreneur Santiago Siri. He is also part of the NGO Bitcoin Argentina, which promotes the blockchain and bitcoin technology in that country.

Since 2016, Cwaik was the Marketing and Communications Manager for Latin America at Maytronics Ltd., an Israeli company which develops robotic pool cleaners. In that position he coordinates the production and staging of the Aquadance, the aquatic acrobatic contest of the TV show Showmatch hosted by Marcelo Tinelli. In 2018 he was promoted and became Maytronics's Global Creativity and Customer Engagement Director.

In 2015 the Apertura magazine and Red Innova chose him as one of the forty most influential and innovative entrepreneurs in Argentina.

In 2016 the President of Argentina Mauricio Macri called him ‘groundbreaker’ and ‘alarmist’ when he said that in the near future new technologies will replace traditional jobs. He affirmed so during an encounter of the J-6, the version for youngsters of the G-6 Group, which unites the main Argentine business entities such as the Argentine Industrial Union, the Buenos Aires Stock Exchange, the Argentine Construction Chamber, the Argentine Chamber of Commerce, and the Argentine Rural Society.

Cwaik was considered in 2017 by Forbes magazine one of the young people under 30 years of greatest impact in Argentina for his work in exponential and disruptive technologies.

As speaker and lecturer, between 2016 and 2018 he has participated in a festival about technology called Campus Party Argentina, Red Innova Buenos Aires, eMerge Americas (Miami), Sinergia Latin America (Mexico), The World of Ideas, PechaKucha Night Buenos Aires and TEDx, the local edition of the TED talks. In 2015 he was appointed Ambassador of Social Media Day Argentina, an event on social networks and digital communications.

During the 2018 G20 Buenos Aires summit, he was part of the Argentine delegation and one of the speakers of the G20 Young Entrepreneurs Alliance (G20 YEA), a summit that has brought together young entrepreneurs and political leaders from all over the world.

In 2019 he was recognised by the National Institute of Youth of Argentina and the International Youth Organism as one of the most distinguished young men of that year.

In 2020 Penguin Random House published his first book '7R: Las siete revoluciones tecnológicas que transformarán nuestra vida' ('7R: The seven tech revolutions that will change our life'). The book was declared 'National Interest' by the Argentinean Parliament.

Also in 2020, he became part of the so-called Assembly of the Future, a counsel organised by Perfil Publishing for journalist advice. He was chosen as one of the 120 Spanish-speaking "Future Leaders" by an IA and machine-learning technology developed by the communication agency Llorente y Cuenca.

In 2021 he released his second book, El Dilema Humano: Del Homo Sapiens al Homo Tech (The Human Dilemma: From Homo Sapiens to Homo Tech) about how technology will change humanity in a post-pandemic world. The book was declared an interest by Buenos Aires City Legislature.

As a technology expert, he collaborates in different media, such as the newspapers Infobae, Clarín (in the 'Next' and 'Al Toque' sections), La Nación, and Perfil, the C5N TV channel, the FM Milenium and FM Rock & Pop radios and the news agency Télam.

References

External links 
 Official website
Twitter Account

1990 births
Living people
People from Buenos Aires
Argentine businesspeople
TEDx conferences